SIRIUS XM Patriot Plus is a U.S. talk channel on Sirius XM Radio's Internet Listening service that plays conservative talk programs. The channel is a spin-off from the newly merged Sirius XM Patriot channel, which retooled the lineups on Sirius XM radios to clear many Sirius XM exclusive hosts live, as well as add the Glenn Beck program to the lineup. Patriot Plus airs replays of Patriot exclusive hosts, and airs terrestrial shows in live timeslots that formerly aired on Sirius Patriot or America Right, such as Laura Ingraham and Bill Bennett. Patriot Plus also airs Rusty Humphries' program live, currently heard on a delayed basis on SIRIUS XM Patriot.

In June 2010, Laura Ingraham was removed from the lineup. There was no explanation given.

On August 1, 2016, the Patriot Plus Channel was deleted from the SiriusXM channel line up without announcement or explanation.

Weekdays

See also 
 SIRIUS XM Patriot

External links
 Sirius XM Patriot Plus on Sirius Radio

XM Satellite Radio channels
Digital-only radio stations
News and talk radio stations in the United States
Radio stations established in 2010